Gonionota phocodes is a moth in the family Depressariidae. It was described by Edward Meyrick in 1909. It is found in Peru.

The wingspan is about 16 mm. The forewings are purplish-ferruginous brown with some undefined fine whitish-ochreous irroration, especially towards the costa anteriorly, and on a rather broad fascia from before the middle of the costa to the tornus. The hindwings are dark fuscous, lighter anteriorly.

References

Moths described in 1909
Gonionota